The Brahe House, located at 456 Telfair St. in Augusta, Georgia, was built in 1850.  It was listed on the National Register of Historic Places in 1973.

It is a three-story cottage built by/for Frederick Adolphus Brahe.  It is "a unique structure to this part of town" in that it reflects Sand Hills Cottage architecture with Greek Revival style while having a "full English basement".

References

External links

Houses on the National Register of Historic Places in Georgia (U.S. state)
Sand Hills cottage architecture
Greek Revival architecture in Georgia (U.S. state)
Houses completed in 1850
Richmond County, Georgia